Anoxia matutinalis is a species of dung beetle in the family Scarabaeidae.

Subspecies
 Anoxia matutinalis matutinalis Laporte de Castelnau, 1823 
 Anoxia matutinalis suturalis Reitter, 1890

Description
Body shows short whitish hairs and a pale brown color, with prothorax darker than the elytrae. Elytra have a few longitudinal whitish bands.

Distribution
This species is present in Corsica, Croatia, Greece, Italy and Sicily. In Sardinia is present an endemic specie, the Anoxia matutinalis sardoa

References 

Melolonthinae
Beetles described in 1823